Polany Surowiczne  (Poliany Surovychni) is a former village in the administrative district of Gmina Komańcza, within Sanok County, Subcarpathian Voivodeship, in south-eastern Poland, close to the border with Slovakia.

References

Polany Surowiczne